A bronze statue of Tadeusz Kościuszko by Antoni Popiel is installed in Washington, D.C.'s Lafayette Park, in the United States.

The statue is listed on the National Register of Historic Places, as a part of American Revolution Statuary in Washington, D.C.

A copy of the monument was unveiled in Warsaw, Poland, in 2010.

History
The monument was dedicated by William Howard Taft, on May 11, 1910.

See also
 Equestrian statue of Tadeusz Kościuszko (Milwaukee)
 List of public art in Washington, D.C., Ward 2

References

External links
 
 http://www.dcpages.com/gallery/Star-of-Washington/DSC08629.jpg.html

1910 sculptures
Kosciuszko
Bronze sculptures in Washington, D.C.
Historic district contributing properties in Washington, D.C.
Washington, D.C.
Lafayette Square, Washington, D.C.
Vandalized works of art in Washington, D.C.